The Party for Freedom and Progress (PFF) is a regional liberal political party in the German-speaking Community of Belgium.

The party still retains the German version of the name of the all-Belgian liberal party in the sixties, the Party for Freedom and Progress, and is a constituent member of the Reformist Movement.

See also
Liberalism
Contributions to liberal theory
Liberalism worldwide
List of liberal parties
Liberal democracy
Liberalism in Belgium

References

External links
 Official website

Conservative liberal parties
Classical liberal parties
Liberal parties in Belgium
Political parties in the German-speaking Community of Belgium